Saline Creek may refer to:

Saline Creek (Cedar Creek), a stream in Missouri
Saline Creek (Mississippi River), a stream in Missouri
Saline Creek (Osage River), a stream in Missouri